Greatest Hits is the first compilation album of American country music artist Tim McGraw. It was released on November 21, 2000, and reached #1 on the Billboard Country album charts & #4 on the Billboard Top 200 album charts. All of the songs, with the exception of  "Let's Make Love" (a duet with his wife, Faith Hill), were released on various albums by the singer. It sold six million copies United States till 2008.

Track listing

Singles
The only single released from this album is "Let's Make Love". It reached #6 on the U.S. Country Charts and #54 on the U.S. Hot 100, and was also included on Faith Hill's Breathe album.

Charts

Weekly charts

Year-end charts

Certifications

References

2000 greatest hits albums
Tim McGraw albums
Albums produced by Byron Gallimore
Albums produced by James Stroud
Curb Records compilation albums
Albums produced by Tim McGraw